Multiquaestia is a genus of moths of the family Tortricidae.

Species
Multiquaestia albimaculana Karisch, 2005

See also
List of Tortricidae genera

References

External links
tortricidae.com

Tortricidae genera
Olethreutinae